Bhuli may refer to:

Bhuli, India
Bhuli, Nepal